Eva Gerlach (born April 9, 1948) is a Dutch poet. She also writes under the name Margaret Dijkstra.

Biography
She was born in Amsterdam. In 1979, she published her first collection of poetry Verder geen leed (No Further Distress) in 1979. In 2000, she received the P. C. Hooft Award for her work. In 1999 she won the Nienke van Hichtum-prijs for Hee meneer Eland.

Her work has appeared in various literary magazines and English translations of her poetry were included in the anthologies Women Writing in Dutch (1994) and Turning Tides (1994).

In 2016 she won the Awater Poëzieprijs for her work Ontsnappingen.

Selected works 
 Dochter (Daughter), poetry (1984)
 Domicilie (Domicile), poetry (1987)
 De kracht van verlamming (The power of paralysis), poetry (1988)
 Wat zoekraakt (What is lost), poetry (1994), received the Jan Campert Prize
 Hee meneer Eland, children's poetry (1998, received Nienke van Hichtum-prijs)
 Oog in oog in oog in oog (Eye to Eye to Eye to Eye), children's poetry (2001)
 Situaties (Situations) (2006)

References

External links

1948 births
Living people
20th-century Dutch poets
21st-century Dutch poets
Dutch women poets
20th-century pseudonymous writers
21st-century pseudonymous writers
Pseudonymous women writers
Writers from Amsterdam
Nienke van Hichtum Prize winners